Roland Weill (born 28 December 1948) is a French rower. He competed at the 1976 Summer Olympics and the 1980 Summer Olympics.

References

External links
 

1948 births
Living people
French male rowers
Olympic rowers of France
Rowers at the 1976 Summer Olympics
Rowers at the 1980 Summer Olympics
Place of birth missing (living people)
World Rowing Championships medalists for France